Megametope is a genus of crabs in the family Xanthidae, containing the following species:

 Megametope carinatus Baker, 1907
 Megametope ogaensis Sakai, 1974
 Megametope punctatus (Haswell, 1882)
 Megametope rotundifrons (H. Milne Edwards, 1834)

References

Xanthoidea
Taxa named by Henri Filhol